Fátima is a city in the municipality of Ourém and district of Santarém in the Central Region of Portugal, with 71.29 km2 of area and 13,212 inhabitants (2021). The homonymous civil parish encompasses several villages and localities of which the city of Fátima is the largest.

The civil parish has been permanently associated with Our Lady of Fátima, a series of 1917 Marian apparitions that were purportedly witnessed by three local shepherd children at the Cova da Iria. The Catholic Church later recognized these events as "worthy of belief". A small chapel was built at the site of the apparition in 1919, and a statue of Mary installed. The chapel and statue have since been enclosed within the Sanctuary of Our Lady of Fátima, a shrine complex containing two minor basilicas. Associated facilities for pilgrims, including a hotel and medical centre, have also been built over the decades within and around the Sanctuary. The city has become an important international destination for religious tourists, receiving between 6 and 8 million pilgrims yearly.

History

Name origin
The name of the town and parish is a rendition of the Arabic given name Fátima. According to the traditional narrative, Fátima was said to be the name of a Moorish princess kidnapped by a knight, Gonçalo Hermigues, and his companions. Hermigues took her to a small village in the Serra de Aire hills, in the recently established Kingdom of Portugal. Fatima fell in love with her kidnapper and decided to convert to Christianity to marry him. She was baptized and given the Christian name “Oureana”. However, the place name recalls the princess' original Arab name rather than her Christian one.

Marian apparitions and "Sun miracle"

The parish was founded in 1568, when it was annexed by the Collegiate of Ourém. For centuries, most of the villagers kept herds of sheep and depended on subsistence farming.

Since the 18th century, Fátima has been associated with events related to Marian apparitions. The first supposed apparition dates back to the mid 18th century in Ortiga, now a quarter of Fátima, when, according to popular belief, the Virgin Mary purportedly appeared to a young, mute shepherdess and asked for one of her sheep, causing the girl to speak in response. This event supposedly incited the creation of the Sanctuary of Our Lady of Ortiga in 1758, which, in 1801, prompted Pope Pius VII to grant an indulgence to all pilgrims visiting the Marian shrine.

Later in the early 20th century, a similar event took place in which three local children, Lúcia dos Santos and her cousins, Francisco and Jacinta Marto, purportedly saw visions of a woman known as Our Lady of Fátima, since believed by the Catholic Church to be the Virgin Mary. On 13 May 1917, whilst guarding their families' sheep in the Cova da Iria, the children first claimed to have seen an apparition of a "lady dressed in white" and shining with a bright light.

To the west, near Aljustrel, is Loca do Cabeço, a smaller agglomeration of rocky outcroppings where, in 1916, an angel appeared twice to the three children. The children claimed to have seen the Marian apparition on six occasions; they said the last would be 13 October 1917. An estimated 70,000 pilgrims went to the site for the last prophesied apparition in October. Some of them reported what has been referred to as the Miracle of the Sun, when some observers reported it appeared to be behaving unusually.

The local bishop investigated the events and determined that the apparitions were worthy of belief. The site was marked by a cross erected by locals. In 1918 they built a small chapel of rock and limestone and covered in tile. It became a centre for Marian devotion, receiving names such as a fé de Fátima, cidade da Paz ("the faith of Fátima, City of Peace"), or Terra de Milagres e Aparições ("Land of Miracles and Apparitions"). The focus of Fatima as a place for peace pilgrimages developed in World War II when Lucia's messages were linked to the conflict.

The chapel has since been enclosed within a large basilica and sanctuary, part of a complex including a hotel and other facilities. In 1930, the statue of Our Lady in the Chapel of Apparitions was crowned by the Vatican.

Francisco died in 1919 and Jacinta in 1920, during the international Spanish flu pandemic. Lucia dos Santos became a nun and lived until 2005. The two who died young were beatified on 13 May 2000 by Pope John Paul II, and were canonised by Pope Francis on 13 May 2017, the hundredth anniversary of the first apparition.

Subsequent development
The construction of the sanctuary and the steady visits by pilgrims stimulated local development. In addition to construction of a large shrine, basilica, and sanctuary, the complex includes a hotel and other facilities. The town of Fátima was elevated to the status of city on 12 July 1997.

In the early 21st century, numerous residents of the parish (primarily from its business sector) worked to have Fátima designated as an independent municipality. The project, led by Júlio Silva, engineer and ex-president of the Junta de Freguesia (Parish Council), was vetoed in July 2003 by President of Portugal Jorge Sampaio.

Geography and climate

Geography

Fátima is located in central west Portugal. It borders São Mamede (Batalha) and Minde (Alcanena) to the southwest, Pedrógão and Chancelaria (Torres Novas) in the east, Atouguia and Nossa Senhora das Misericórdias (Ourém) to the north and Santa Catarina da Serra e Chainça (Leiria) to the northwest.

The parish contains the following localities: Aljustrel, Alvaijar, Amoreira, Boleiros, Casa Velha, Casal Farto, Chã, Charneca, Cova da Iria, Eira da Pedra, Fátima, Giesteira, Lombo da Égua, Maxeira, Moimento, Moita Redonda, Moitas, Montelo, Pederneira, Poço de Soudo, Ramila, Vale de Cavalos and Valinho de Fátima.

This plateau represents the northernmost portion of the Estremadura Limestone Massif, which was created during the Middle Jurassic and is characterized by various geological formations including sinkholes, uvalas and polje (like the Polje de Minde-Mata), as well as karst grottoes, caves with stalactites and stalagmites, in addition to lapiez fields. As such, Fátima has geological and cultural similarities with the nature park of Serras de Aire e Candeeiros just south of it.

The soil is characteristically porous which intensifies the already low availability of water in the summer. And even though precipitation in autumn, winter and spring is relatively high, the overall flora is Mediterranean and well adapted to droughts.

The trees in this area are primarily dominated by holly oak (Quercus rotundifolia), Portuguese oak (Quercus faginea), strawberry trees (Arbutus unedo), buckthorn (Rhamnus alaternus), mastic (Pistacia lentiscus), bay laurel (Laurus nobilis) and olive trees, all of which are resistant to both the winter precipitation extremes and the summer drought. There are also areas of savannah, strips of land bounded by walls of loose stone. Pine and eucalyptus forests are also common in the outskirts of the city.

Climate
Fátima has a warm-summer Mediterranean climate (Köppen: Csb) in transition to a hot-summer (Csa).

The climate is characterized by heavy precipitation during late autumn and winter, with approximately  annually, and warm, dry summers. Fátima has considerably more precipitation than other cities nearby in part due to its higher altitude, though precipitation in summer is more or less the same.

Humid air masses coming from N/NW that come into contact with the plateau of Fátima are the reason behind the strong rains experienced in the low-sun half of the year. Light frosts are typical from late December to mid February and temperatures can get down to  occasionally.

Temperatures rarely get above  but when they do they are often accompanied by low humidity which can sometimes lead to unwanted forest fires around the area.

The city has about 2600 hours of annual sunshine. Snow is rare but not uncommon, the last one being in 2016 and 2013 both in 27 February.

Twin towns – Sister cities

Fátima is twinned with:

  Częstochowa in Poland
  Loreto in Italy
  Droß in Austria
  Altötting in Germany
  Lourdes in France
  Selçuk in Turkey

Economy

The economy of the city relies on religious tourism because the world devotion through Our Lady of Fátima attracts millions of Christian pilgrims. The locals have numerous shops and stalls devoted to the sale of religious articles and souvenirs. In addition, services for tourists, hotels, restaurants and other retail also benefit from the visitors. Other economic activities in the region include: marble sculpturing, saw-milling, carpentry, civil construction, commerce, and services.

Papal visits

 May 1967 – Pope Paul VI
 May 1982 – Pope John Paul II (1st visit)
 May 1991 – Pope John Paul II (2nd visit)
 May 2000 – Pope John Paul II (3rd visit)
 May 2010 – Pope Benedict XVI
 May 2017 – Pope Francis

Architecture

Civic
 Bus station of Fátima
 Cistern of Gaiola
 Cistern of Ramila
 Cistern of Capuchos
 Civil Parish Building of Fátima
 Fountain of Alveijar
 Fountain of Lameira
 Fountain of Soudo Well
 Fountain of Vale da Pena
 Fountain New
 House of Casal Farto
 Main avenue of Fátima
 Mills of Fátima
 Mills of Fazarga
 Mills of Giesteira
 Mill of Ortiga
 Monument of the Three Little Shepherds
 Old mill of Ramila
 Olive Oil Press in Estrada das Matas
 Porch House with Sundial
 Residence of Francisco and Jacinta Marto, visionaries of Fátima
 Residence of Lúcia dos Santos
 Threshing-floor of Ramila

Religious

 Chapel of Casal Farto
 Chapel of Lombo de Égua
 Chapel of Our Lady of Conception
 Church of Our Lady of Livramento
 Church of Saint Anthony
It is flanked by colonnades linking it with the extensive convent and hospital buildings. Within the basilica are the tombs of the three witnesses to the apparitions: Jacinta and Francisco Marto and Lúcia dos Santos. The Church of the Holy Trinity, one of the largest churches in the world, was built on the other side of the esplanade in the early 21st century.
 Sanctuary of Fátima
 Chapel of the Apparitions
 Basilica of Our Lady of the Rosary
 Sanctuary of Our Lady of Ortiga
 Parochial church of Fátima
 Stations of the Cross of Valinhos
 Statues of the Angel of Portugal, at the Loca do Cabeço and at the Poço do Arneiro (well of Arneiro) in Aljustrel
 Chapel of Saint Stephen of Hungary
 Byzantine Chapel of the Holy Dormition, identified by its distinctive onion dome. Located at Domus Pacis, the headquarters of the Blue Army of Our Lady of Fátima. Used by the local Ukrainian Greek Catholic community.

Culture
The Sanctuary of Our Lady of Fátima, in Cova da Iria, is the principal focus of all visitors. Annually, at least five million Catholic pilgrims fill the country roads leading to the Marian shrine. Numbers can reach hundreds of the thousands on 13 May and 13 October, the most significant dates of the apparitions in Fátima.

Sports
Fátima's major sports club is the Sport Center of Fátima, currently in Portuguese football's second tier, the LigaPro.

See also

 Our Lady of Fátima
 Parish Church of Fátima
 Sanctuary of Fátima

References

External links

  – Official website
 Sanctuary of Fátima – Online transmissions
 Pilgrims of Fátima – Official website
 "Fatima in Sister Lucia's own words" – Free online version of the memoir book written by Sister Lucia, O.C.D.
 "The True Story of Fatima" – Free online version of the book written by Father John de Marchi, I.M.C.
 Video documentary: Portugal in 150 seconds: Fátima

Our Lady of Fátima
Cities in Portugal
Catholic pilgrimage sites
Shrines to the Virgin Mary
Freguesias of Ourém